Bobbie Sue is the seventh album by The Oak Ridge Boys. It was released on February 10, 1982. Its title song was a #1 country chart hit (on April 3, 1982) and a #12 hit on the Hot 100 singles chart.

The album also featured cover versions of two songs: "So Fine", a song originally by The Fiestas; and "Up on Cripple Creek", originally by The Band.

Track listing

Personnel

The Oak Ridge Boys
Joe Bonsall
Duane Allen
Richard Sterban
William Lee Golden

Musicians
Jimmy Capps - acoustic guitar
Jerry Carrigan - drums, percussion
Gene Chrisman - drums, percussion
Farrell Morris - percussion
 Weldon Myrick  - steel guitar
Ron Oates - keyboards
Billy Sanford - electric guitar, acoustic guitar
Jack Williams - bass guitar
Chip Young - acoustic guitar
Reggie Young - electric guitar

The Muscle Shoals Horns
Harrison Calloway - trumpet
Ronnie Eades - baritone saxophone
Charles Rose - trombone
Harvey Thompson - tenor saxophone, alto saxophone

Strings arranged by Bergen White

Chart performance

Album

Singles

The Oak Ridge Boys albums
1982 albums
MCA Records albums
Albums produced by Ron Chancey